Dewarick Antwain Spencer (born May 4, 1982) is an American and Egyptian professional basketball player who plays for Zamalek of the Egyptian Basketball Super League.

From Mobile, Alabama, he played in college at Iowa Western CC from 2000–2001, Faulkner State CC from 2001–2002 and Arkansas State in the NCAA Division 1 from 2003–2005.

Professional career
Spencer made a name for himself in Europe after winning the French League championship, the French League scoring title, the French League Foreign Player's MVP, and the French All-Star Game MVP during the 2006-07 season while he was with Chorale Roanne. In 2008, Spencer transferred from the Italian League club Virtus Bologna to the Turkish League club Efes Pilsen, after Efes released Drew Nicholas for refusing to travel with the team to Serbia.

For the 2008-09 season, he returned to France after signing with the EuroLeague club Le Mans. With Le Mans he won the French Semanes de As and French Cup in 2009. In 2010, he joined BC Budivelnyk in Ukraine.

In 2011 Dee Spencer won the gold of the Ukrainian championship with Budivelnik. He averaged 20,3 mpg, 10,4 ppg, 1,8 apg, 3,8 rpg with 9,5 EFF.

During 2013, he played in the Lebanese league with Sporting Al Riyadi Beirut basketball club. In August 2013, he signed with Petrochimi Bandar Imam. In December 2013, he was loaned to Zhejiang Golden Bulls. In March 2014, he came back to play in the Lebanese league but this time with Sagesse. In December 2014, he signed with Al Mouttahed Tripoli. In April 2015, he left Al Mouttahed and signed with Guaros de Lara of Venezuela.

In September 2017, Spencer signed with the Goyang Orions of the Korean Basketball League. In December 2017, he left Goyang and signed with Lebanese club Champville SC.

On January 16, 2022, Spencer was announced by Egyptian club Zamalek ahead of the 2022 FIBA Intercontinental Cup.

References

External links
Euroleague.net Profile
Eurobasket.com Profile
Draftexpress.com Profile
TBLStat.net Profile
Italian League Profile 
French League Profile 
ESPN.com College Profile

1982 births
Living people
American expatriate basketball people in China
American expatriate basketball people in France
American expatriate basketball people in Iran
American expatriate basketball people in Italy
American expatriate basketball people in Lebanon
American expatriate basketball people in South Korea
American expatriate basketball people in Turkey
American expatriate basketball people in Ukraine
American men's basketball players
Anadolu Efes S.K. players
Arkansas State Red Wolves men's basketball players
Basketball players from Alabama
BC Budivelnyk players
Chorale Roanne Basket players
Faulkner State Sun Chiefs men's basketball players
Goyang Carrot Jumpers players
Guaros de Lara (basketball) players
Iowa Western Reivers men's basketball players
Jilin Northeast Tigers players
Le Mans Sarthe Basket players
People from Mobile County, Alabama
Petrochimi Bandar Imam BC players
Point guards
Seoul SK Knights players
Shooting guards
Virtus Bologna players
Zhejiang Golden Bulls players
Sagesse SC basketball players
Al Riyadi Club Beirut basketball players